Spindrift Bluff is an east–west trending bluff (about 700 m) located close south of Mistral Ridge in northwest Palmer Land. Surveyed by British Antarctic Survey (BAS), 1971–72, and so named by United Kingdom Antarctic Place-Names Committee (UK-APC), 1977. A local wind blows in this area and spindrift sweeps from the bluff, when it is calm elsewhere.

Cliffs of Palmer Land